Tatum may refer to:

Places

United States
Tatum, Georgia, a ghost town
Tatum, New Mexico, a town
Tatum, South Carolina, a town
Tatum, Texas, a city
Mount Tatum, Alaska

Elsewhere
Tatum, Cameroon, a village
3748 Tatum, an asteroid

People
Tatum (given name)
Tatum (surname)

Other uses
Tatum (music), a subdivision of a beat in music information retrieval
Tatum, a brand name of the SFN Group, a temporary work agency
USS Tatum (DE-789), a destroyer escort that served in World War II